Sri Vengateswaraa Matriculation Higher Secondary school is located in Vennanthur, Namakkal district. Near to Sri Vengateswaraa Polytechnic College and it was founded in 2007 with the goal of educating poor students.

About
The school run by the Sri Ragavendra educational trust.

References

External links
 

Vennandur block
Schools in Tamil Nadu
Education in Namakkal district